Audru was a municipality located in Pärnu County, one of the 15 counties of Estonia.

Settlements
Borough
Lavassaare
Small borough
Audru
Villages
Ahaste, Aruvälja, Eassalu, Jõõpre, Kabriste, Kärbu, Kihlepa, Kõima, Lemmetsa, Liiva, Lindi, Liu, Malda, Marksa, Oara, Papsaare, Põhara, Põldeotsa, Ridalepa, Saari, Saulepa, Soeva, Soomra, Tuuraste, Valgeranna.

See also
Audru Ring
Lake Lavassaare

References

External links
 Official website 

 
Former municipalities of Estonia